Needles is a surname. People with the surname include:

Birth names
 Arthur C. Needles (1867–1936), President of the Norfolk and Western Railway
 Belverd Needles (fl. 1970s–2020s), American economist and professor at DePaul University
 Dan Needles, Canadian 20th-21st century playwright
 Ira Needles (1893–1986), second chancellor of the University of Waterloo in Canada
 Jimmy Needles (1900–1969), American basketball coach
 John Needles (1786–1878), active Quaker and noted Maryland abolitionist
 Thomas B. Needles (1835–1914), American politician and businessman
 William Needles (1919–2016), American-born Canadian actor and teacher

Stage names
 Nique Needles (fl. 1980s–2020s), stage name of Cornelius Delaney, Australian artist, musician, and actor
 Sharon Needles (born 1981), stage name of Aaron Coady, an American drag performer and recording artist